Archibald Henry Plantagenet Stuart-Wortley (26 April 1832 – 30 April 1890), was a British Conservative Party politician.

Background
Stuart-Wortley was the son of the Hon. Charles Stuart-Wortley-Mackenzie, second son of James Stuart-Wortley-Mackenzie, 1st Baron Wharncliffe. His mother was Lady Emmeline, daughter of John Manners, 5th Duke of Rutland. Victoria, Lady Welby, was his sister.

Political career
Stuart-Wortley sat as Member of Parliament for Honiton alongside Joseph Locke between 1857 and 1859.

Personal life
He married Lavinia Rebecca Gibbins (d. 1937) on 15 June 1879. Stuart-Wortley died in April 1890, aged 58.

References

External links 
 

1832 births
1890 deaths
Conservative Party (UK) MPs for English constituencies
UK MPs 1857–1859
Archibald
Members of the Parliament of the United Kingdom for Honiton